Albert Costa was the defending champion but did not compete that year.

Alberto Berasategui won in the final 6–2, 6–4, 6–4 against Àlex Corretja.

Seeds
A champion seed is indicated in bold text while text in italics indicates the round in which that seed was eliminated. All sixteen seeds received a bye to the second round.

  Thomas Muster (quarterfinals)
  Marcelo Ríos (third round)
  Félix Mantilla (third round)
  Carlos Moyá (second round)
  Alberto Berasategui (champion)
  Bohdan Ulihrach (third round)
  Francisco Clavet (second round)
  Bernd Karbacher (second round)
  Andriy Medvedev (third round)
  Gilbert Schaller (second round)
  Àlex Corretja (final)
  Ctislav Doseděl (third round)
  Filip Dewulf (quarterfinals)
  Sjeng Schalken (third round)
  Jordi Burillo (second round)
  Javier Sánchez (second round)

Draw

Finals

Top half

Section 1

Section 2

Bottom half

Section 3

Section 4

References
 1996 EA-Generali Open Draw

Austrian Open Kitzbühel
1996 ATP Tour